"Maybe I Know" is an early 1960s pop song written by Jeff Barry and Ellie Greenwich and performed by Lesley Gore.  The song was one in a long line of successful "Brill Building Sound" hits created by composers and arrangers working in New York City's Brill Building at 1619 Broadway.  Pop songwriting stars Barry and Greenwich had previously scored hits with songs such as "Be My Baby" and "Baby, I Love You" performed by The Ronettes, as well as "Then He Kissed Me" and "Da Doo Ron Ron"  by The Crystals.

"Maybe I Know" reached #14 on the Billboard Hot 100, #16 in Canada, #20 in the United Kingdom, and #37 in Australia in 1964. It was featured on her 1964 album, Girl Talk.  Billboard described the song as a "medium
tempo rocker with fine dance beat."  Cash Box described it as "a handclappin' thumper geared for easy dancing and listening approval" and a "tuneful teen-angled vocal romp."

The song was produced by Quincy Jones and arranged by Claus Ogerman.

Charts

Weekly charts

Other versions
The Seashells released a version of the song as a single in 1972 that reached #32 in the UK. Greenwich herself released a version of the song as a single in 1973. They Might Be Giants covered the song in many live performances, before a studio-recorded version was featured on their 1999 album, Long Tall Weekend. Alessi's Ark released a version of the song on her 2011 album, Time Travel.

In media
The song was featured in the musicals Leader of the Pack and The Marvelous Wonderettes.

References

1964 songs
1964 singles
1972 singles
1973 singles
Songs written by Jeff Barry
Songs written by Ellie Greenwich
Lesley Gore songs
Song recordings produced by Quincy Jones
Mercury Records singles
Verve Records singles
Brill Building songs
Songs about infidelity